The village of Arden, is an art colony in New Castle County, Delaware,  United States, founded in 1900 as a radical Georgist single-tax community by sculptor Frank Stephens and architect Will Price. The village occupies approximately 160 acres, with half kept as open land. According to the 2010 census, the population of the village is 439. In 1973, the entire village was listed on the National Register of Historic Places.

Two neighboring villages of similar size were founded on Georgist principles, Ardentown, in 1922, and Ardencroft, in 1950.  In 2003, they were also listed on the NRHP as the Ardens Historic District. Many Ardenites, as the villagers of Arden are called, consider themselves to be "close-knit, nature-loving, liberal, tolerant, free-spirited, artistic, intellectual, even ex-hippie".

History
Arden was founded in 1900 by sculptor Frank Stephens and architect Will Price, based on ideas such as Henry George's single-tax, William Morris’s Arts and Crafts principles, and Peter Kropotkin's theories of community.  Philanthropist Joseph Fels funded the project.

The single-tax movement, popular in the U.S. and other countries from the 1890s until the 1930s, is based on the belief that the best way to raise government money was to tax only the value of unimproved land and the public-created value, like roads, added to the land.  The tax, based on a systematized assessment, would recover both the value of natural resources and public investment for the public, while not impeding labor and capital from profiting from their efforts.  Followers of Henry George's philosophy of economics created Arden as an experiment in the single-tax idea after a failed attempt to implement Georgism in the entire state of Delaware in the late 19th century.

Englishman William Morris rebelled against modern cities and industry. He advocated a return to craft production, good design, and village life.  Kropotkin was primarily an anarcho-communist whose ideas regarding social and community living were used by the founders of Arden to advance Morris' ideas for the return to village life.

Land in Arden cannot be sold; instead it has a renewable 99-year lease. The leasehold interest in the land has a market value and can be sold. People are free to improve it as they choose, but the land-lease fee will not increase because of improvements.  Arden is not exempt from New Castle County land taxes, but the buildings within the village are taxed separately for county and school district revenue, while the land is technically one large parcel, and taxed by New Castle County accordingly.  The land is held in a trust, administered by three elected trustees, who have lifelong tenure. Arden's tax structure is currently based upon the individual leaseholds. Most leaseholds are residential, and the land rent is based upon the square footage rather than the improvements upon the land. A seven-member board of assessors, elected using single transferable vote to ensure representation of minority viewpoints, divides the County's full assessment of the residential areas of Arden among the individual lots. Lots that are nearer to open space or woodlands are assessed a bit higher, while lots nearer main road are assessed a bit lower.

At first, Arden was a summer community. People lived the simple life in tents or rustic dwellings.  By 1909, much of the land had been leased, mostly for summer use.  By 1922 there were 148 leaseholders, 100 buildings, 350 summer residents, and 100 winter residents.

The founding of the Arden Club , a volunteer run, community center in 1908 provided an organizational core for community activity. Interest groups and task groups were called gilds  rather than committees. From the beginning, Shakespeare’s plays were produced in the outdoor Field Theater. Fairs, pageants, and Arden holidays filled the calendar.  Many of these events continue today through various community organizations including the Arden Recreation and Community Association (ARCA) and the Arden Club, as well as through some of the village committees for each of the three Ardens. The Georgist Gild no longer exists (ended in 2014), but the Georgists continues to offer courses in Georgist economics to the Ardens and any other interested communities.

Shakespeare's plays were produced early in Arden's history to promote better oratory skills among the Georgists and have continued if only as a tradition and form of entertainment.

It took longer to implement the Arts-and-Crafts ideal because the community was so small at first. Many people worked in Wilmington or Philadelphia. In 1913, the Craft Shop was built, which provided facilities for various artisans. Arden crafts, especially from the Arden Forge and Arden Weavers, became popular in the area.

The conceptual lifestyle of Arden proved so popular that it expanded twice, with Ardentown in 1922 and Ardencroft in 1950. Today, the Ardens remain as single-tax communities at the village municipal level. The spirit of Arden encourages all sorts of artistic and intellectual expression and a strong community life.  Most of the village activities and Club activities are run by volunteers.

Arden, Delaware and its sister villages, Ardentown and Ardencroft, are in the National Historic Register because of their cultural landscape, rather than its land or buildings. Still, there are several buildings associated with Stephens and Price, including old farm houses and converted barns, the Craftshop, the Weaveshop, and a number of fine Craftsman Houses, that have historical and architectural interest.

Architecture

There are six named houses in Arden designed by Will Price: Friendly Gables (built 1909), 2205 Little Lane; The Lodge (1910), 2209 The Sweep; Rest Cottage (1910), 2328 Cherry Lane; Green Gate (1909), 2210 The Sweep; The Second Homestead (1909), 2311 Woodland; and The Fels House (1909), 2110 Orleans Road. Price also designed the Arden Craft Shop in 1913.  His designs are generally Elizabethan Revival and show the influence of the Arts and Crafts movement.  The first houses built in Arden were small summer cottages that have been destroyed, or in a few cases greatly enlarged.  Small worker's cottages were also built after the completion of the Craft Shop.  Price may have participated in the designs of both these forms as well.  Residents often designed, built and named their own cottages.  Upton Sinclair's cottage was built with funds from Joseph Fels and named by other residents "Jungalow."

Geography
It is bounded by Sherwood Forest, Marsh Road, Hanby Park, and the expansion villages of Ardentown and Ardencroft.

Infrastructure

Transportation

Delaware Route 3 runs southwest-northeast along the western border of Arden as Marsh Road, heading south toward Wilmington and north toward Delaware Route 92 west of Claymont. Harvey Road runs northwest-southeast through Arden and leads southeast to a partial interchange with Interstate 95, which  has access to southbound I-95 toward Wilmington and access from northbound I-95 coming from Wilmington, and to U.S. Route 13 Business southwest of Claymont. DART First State provides bus service to Arden along Route 11, which heads south via DE 3 and Washington Street to the Wilmington station serving Amtrak and SEPTA Regional Rail's Wilmington/Newark Line.

Utilities
Delmarva Power, a subsidiary of Exelon, provides electricity and natural gas to Arden. Suez Delaware, a subsidiary of Suez North America, provides water to Arden. Sewer service in Arden is provided by New Castle County. Trash and recycling collection in Arden is provided by Trash Tech.

Education
It is in the Brandywine School District.

Notable people
Joe Biden – the 46th president of the United States, lived in Arden during part of his childhood.
 (1862–1951)
 (1883–1960)

Demographics

As of the census of 2000, there were 474 people, 229 households, and 122 families residing in the village. The racial makeup of the village was 95.15% White, 0.84% African American, 0.42% Native American, 1.69% Asian, and 1.90% from two or more races. Hispanic or Latino of any race were 2.32% of the population.

There were 229 households, out of which 21.4% had children under the age of 18 living with them, 38.9% were married couples living together, 11.4% had a female householder with no husband present, and 46.3% were non-families. 38.4% of all households were made up of individuals, and 10.0% had someone living alone who was 65 years of age or older.  The average household size was 2.07 and the average family size was 2.80.

In the village, the population was spread out, with 18.1% under the age of 18, 3.2% from 18 to 24, 24.1% from 25 to 44, 35.9% from 45 to 64, and 18.8% who were 65 years of age or older.  The median age was 46 years. For every 100 females, there were 95.9 males.  For every 100 females age 18 and over, there were 89.3 males.

The median income for a household in the village was $56,731, and the median income for a family was $70,893. Males had a median income of $48,125 versus $38,333 for females. The per capita income for the village was $30,422.  None of the families and 2.1% of the population were living below the poverty line, including no under eighteens and 2.0% of those over 64.

See also

References

External links

Village Charter

1900 establishments in Delaware
Geography of New Castle County, Delaware
Georgist communities
Historic districts on the National Register of Historic Places in Delaware
National Register of Historic Places in New Castle County, Delaware
Populated places established in 1900
Villages in Delaware
Villages in New Castle County, Delaware
Utopian communities in the United States